Gidget's Summer Reunion is a 1985 American made-for-television adventure comedy-drama film produced by Columbia Pictures Television that aired in syndication on June 1, 1985. It was written by Robert Blees and George Zateslo, directed by Bruce Bilson and stars Caryn Richman as Gidget, Dean Butler, Allison Barron, William Schallert, Anne Lockhart and Mary Frann.

Plot
Now in their late twenties and married, Gidget and Jeff live in Santa Monica. Jeff is an architect and Gidget is a travel agent. They have no children of their own but are minding Gidget's 15-year-old niece Kim while Kim's parents are in Europe.

Their marriage is troubled, in part because they are becoming workaholics and leaving themselves too little quality time.

Gidget plans a surprise 30th birthday party for Jeff that will reunite their old surfing friends, but she must take the place of a coworker and coordinate a trip in Hawaii. Jeff resists romantic advances from Anne Bedford, his beautiful and libidinous boss.

Kim acts much as did Gidget at the same age. She wants to learn how to surf but sneaks out of the house to see Mickey, a suave, self-serving beach bum, behind the back of Albert, her nerdy boyfriend.

Gidget returns from Hawaii just in time to save her marriage and rescue Kim from her troubles.

Cast
 Caryn Richman as Francine "Gidget" Griffin
 Dean Butler as Jeff "Moondoggie" Griffin
 Allison Barron as Kim
 William Schallert as Russ Lawrence
 Anne Lockhart as Larue Powell
 Mary Frann as Anne Bedford
 Don Stroud as The Great Kahoona
 Vincent Van Patten as Mickey
 Johnny Yune as Johnny Soon
 David Knell as Albert Winslow
 Ben Murphy as Ron Levering
 Will Nye as Slim
 Steven Kavner as Malibu Mac
 Michael Pniewski as Scooter Boy (as Michael Pniewski)
 Peter Ackerman as Darryl
 Brad Zutaut as Kirk
 Buck Young as Bob
 Gillian Dobb as Mary Jane
 George Zateslo as Hot Dog
 Bill Edwards as Harry Schaffer
 Danny Kamekona as George the Chauffeur
 Moe Keale as Bob the Driver

See also
 Gidget (film)
 Gidget Goes Hawaiian
 Gidget Goes to Rome
 Gidget (TV series)
 Gidget Grows Up
 List of television films produced for American Broadcasting Company

References

Sources

External links
 
 
 

ABC Movie of the Week
1985 television films
1985 films
Gidget films
Films set in California
Television sequel films
Films directed by Bruce Bilson